Adam Yuki Baig (born 12 April 1999) is a Japanese handball player for Zeekstar Tokyo and the Japanese national team.

He represented Japan at the 2019 World Men's Handball Championship.

References

External links
 
 

1999 births
Living people
Japanese male handball players
Expatriate handball players
Japanese expatriate sportspeople in France
Handball players at the 2020 Summer Olympics
Japanese people of Pakistani descent